The Secret City was a television series designed to teach children how to draw.

The series was produced by Maryland Public Television and aired on PBS and TVOntario in the late 1980s.

The series starred Mark Kistler as Commander Mark who led viewers through various drawing exercises and examples.   It also featured other characters, including Zebtron, Metaman and Cindy the Dragon.  Occasionally, guest artists would appear on the show to demonstrate other art forms.

References

External links
The Draw Squad
The Secret City Mural

1980s American children's television series
PBS original programming